This article provides a list of women composers, sorted alphabetically by surname. For a list of women composers sorted by year of birth, see List of women composers by birth date.


A

B

C

D

E

F

G

H

I

J

K

L

M

N

O

P

Q

R

S

T

U

V

W

X

Y

Z

See also
 List of Australian women composers

 
women
Composers
Women in music